The Journal of the Chinese Language Teachers Association, or Zhongwen jiaoshi xuehui xuebao (中文教師學會學報), is an academic journal in the field of language education, focusing upon aspects of Chinese as a foreign language, Chinese linguistics, and Chinese literature. It was established in 1966, and is published three times a year by Chinese Language Teachers Association. The current editor in chief is Zheng-sheng Zhang (San Diego State University).

See also 

 John DeFrancis

External links
Official website
Chinese-language education
Multilingual journals
Publications established in 1966
Chinese studies journals
Triannual journals